Raqt is a 2013 Indian Hindi psychological thriller film produced by Ashish Mishra & Amit Mishra and directed by Adi Irani & Shiva Rindan. The film stars Shweta Bhardwaj, Arjun Mahajan, Sheena Sahabadi and Gulshan Grover in lead roles and was released on 27 September 2013.

Plot
The film revolves around Sonia (played by Sweta Bharadwaj) and Suhani (played by Sheena Shahabadi). The film is about the fatal obsession of an adopted daughter for her mother's affection.

Sonia is a single mother who adopts her sister's daughter when her sister and brother-in-law die in an accident due to her carelessness. Sonia, along with her maid Maria (Farida Jalal), pampers Suhani to not let her miss her parents.
 But this has an opposite effect with Suhani, with her developing an obsessive relationship with Sonia. She will let nothing come between her and her mother.

Unaware of her child's problem, Sonia becomes a career-woman not focusing on her personal life beyond Suhani. She becomes a successful heroine. One day, Suhani sees Sonia and a friend arguing. She kills him, and Sonia takes the blame and is jailed for seven years.

Cast
 Gulshan Grover as Prince Ranbir Singh 
 Shakti Kapoor
 Shweta Bhardwaj as Sonia
 Sheena Shahabadi as Suhani 
 Farida Jalal as Maria
 Suhani Tak 
 Adi Irani as Police Officer 
 Suresh Menon

Soundtrack

The soundtrack of Rakt consists of 6 songs composed by Daboo Malik while the lyrics of which written by Panchhi Jalonvi.

References

External links
 

2013 films
2010s Hindi-language films
Indian psychological thriller films
2013 psychological thriller films